Uludoruk Glacier is a glacier on Mount Uludoruk, one of the Taurus Mountains and the second highest mountain in Turkey.

See also
 Ark of Nuh or Noah
 Armenian highlands
 List of mountains in Turkey
 Zagros Mountains
 Cilo Dağı
 Mount Judi

References

Geography of Hakkâri Province
Glaciers of Turkey
Mountains of the Armenian Highlands
Uludoruk
Taurus Mountains
Zagros Mountains